Anna Dolidze (born 26 October 1979) is a Georgian attorney, professor of international law and government official. A speaker and writer on international lawand human rights in Caucasus and Central Eurasia, she was appointed as the chief legal adviser to the President of Georgia on 27 June 2016. On 8 January 2018 the President of Georgia appointed Dolidze to the High Council of Justice, the body that oversees the judiciary.

Career 
Born in Tbilisi, Dolidze graduated from the Tbilisi State University with a degree in law summa cum laude in 2002. In 2004 Dolidze received master's degree in International Law from Leiden University. In 2000-2001, she was an assistant of the domestic violence public cooperation program at the Georgia office of the organization Project Harmony International, then - the coordinator of the same program; In 2004–2006 Dolidze was the President of the Georgian Young Lawyers' Association, the leading human rights organization in Georgia. Dolidze represented in court the victims of human rights abuses, including journalist Irakli Imnaishvili, "rebel judges" (four Justices of the Supreme Court that refused to resign under pressure), Anna Dolidze was a leader of the social movement to punish murderers of Sandro Girgvliani. in 2004-2006 Dolidze targeted legal reform, advocated for government transparency, accountability, and criminal justice reform. In 2013-2016, she was an assistant professor at the Faculty of Law of the University of Western Ontario (Canada); From May 2015 to June 27, 2016, she worked as the Deputy Minister of Defense of Georgia; Dolidze was appointed as the Chief Lawyer for the President of Georgia Giorgi Margvelashvili. From June 27, 2016 to January 8, 2018, she was the parliamentary secretary of the President of Georgia; As a Parliamentary Secretary Dolidze presented six Presidential Vetoes to the Parliament. In the Georgian Parliament she presented the Presidential Vetoes on the Law on Surveillance, Law on Local Government, Election Code, Law on Common Courts, and Constitutional Amendments. President Margvelashvili appointed Dolidze to the High Council of Justice, the independent body that oversees the judiciary. Dolidze was the most active member of the  council. she ran a campaign to protest the lack of rule of law and informal governance of the courts i.e. “the clan.” She was attacked by the judges several times. Dolidze resigned from the Council in protest.

Dolidze was chosen as one of the 12 Women on the Barricades by the Norwegian Helsinki Committee on Human Rights.

Dolidze is the only author of the official public petition to receive 10 thousand signatures. The most serious demand of the petition, to regulate gambling advertising, was implemented by the government. Her petition to restrict the sale of property to the Russian nationals also received 10,000 signatures. Dolidze’s party presented a draft law to the Parliament based on the petition, however the Parliament did not hear the draft.

In 2018 Dolidze initiated a campaign for Safe Swimming together with other civil society activists, with the objective to reduce deaths related to swimming and water. As a result of the campaign, Tbilisi Municipality was pressured to establish a security fence at the Tbilisi Sea area, dubbed “the death zone.” 

Dolidze is an active speaker on women’s rights.

Dolidze is an active speaker on women’s rights. She founded Women Empowerment Network to mentor and empower young women leaders.

She served on boards of a number of important organizations in Georgia, such as the Georgia Media Council, the Stakeholders Committee of the Millennium Challenge Corporation in Georgia, the Human Rights Monitoring Council of the Penitentiary and Detention Places, and the National Commission against Trafficking in Persons.

In 2012 Dolidze testified before the US Congress. In 2013 Dolidze received a JSD (doctorate in law) from Cornell Law School and was appointed assistant professor of law at the University of Western Ontario. Dolidze was appointed as a Deputy Minister of Defense on 15 May 2015. In February 2016, she was nominated to a vacant seat on the Supreme Court of Georgia, replacing Levan Murusidze.

On 21 May 2021, Dolidze founded her own political party, For the People.

Political career
Anna Dolidze founded the civil movement "For the people" in May 2020.<ref>{{cite news |title=Anna Dolidze founded a movement "For the people|url=https://www.interpressnews.ge/ka/article/600774-ana-dolizem-samokalako-mozraoba-xalxistvis-daapuzna/|access-date=4 August 2022 |work=interpressnews.ge |date=21 May 2020 |language=ka-GE}}</ref>

In the parliamentary elections of 2020, she was an independent candidate for the majority of Tbilisi Didube and Chugureti. She received 17.95% (12,381 votes) and took the third place after the candidate of Georgian Dream, Gia Volski (42.64%) and the general candidate of the opposition and the founder of Girchi - more freedom, Zurab Japaridze (21.06%).

On May 22, 2021, she founded the party "For the People", and those gathered at the congress elected Ana Dolidze as the chairman of the party.

In 2021, she was a candidate for mayor of Tbilisi, she won 4.56% (21,935) votes and took the third place among the opposition candidates, while her party won 14,988 votes nationwide and won two seats in the Assembly.

Ana Dolidze proposed a proposal to the working group of the Parliament on the issue of deoligarchization. The main goal of the proposal was to limit the levers with which Bidzina Ivanishvili manages the state. Specifically, former or current employees working in "Kartu Bank" and other of his businesses should not have the right to hold political positions.

Ana Dolidze, according to the September public opinion survey of the International Republican Institute (IRI), ranks first among opposition politicians.

Academic career
Dolidze is a Professor of International Law at the Georgian Institute for Public Affairs. Dolidze publishes academic papers. 
She is an author of three books: "To an unknown port", "Academic Writing in Law", her last book “First Steps: Georgian Judiciary 1918-1921” tells the history of the establishment of the Georgian courts.

 Public appearances 
Dolidze frequently appears on media to comment about the issues of law, justice, and human rights  
Dolidze has been quoted in The Wall Street Journal and The Washington Post''. She is a frequent speaker at conferences and panels worldwide. In 2022, she was invited to the TED Talk event, where she spoke on the topic "Leading with Your Shadow".

References

External links

  at the Asan Institute for Policy Studies about transitional justice 
 TV debate on reforms in Georgia
 Talk at the Heinrich Böll Stiftung on the politics of memory in Georgia

Leiden University alumni
Cornell Law School alumni
Living people
Democracy activists from Georgia (country)
Women lawyers from Georgia (country)
Lawyers from Tbilisi
Tbilisi State University alumni
1979 births